Joshua William Lindblom (born June 15, 1987) is an American former professional baseball pitcher. He played in Major League Baseball (MLB) for the Los Angeles Dodgers, Philadelphia Phillies, Texas Rangers, Oakland Athletics, Pittsburgh Pirates, and Milwaukee Brewers and in the KBO League for the Lotte Giants and Doosan Bears.

Career

Amateur and minor league career
Lindblom attended Harrison High School in West Lafayette, Indiana. He was drafted in the third round of the 2005 MLB draft by the Houston Astros after being listed by Baseball America as the top prospect in the state of Indiana. He was 8–2 as a high school senior with a 2.30 ERA and 117 strikeouts in 76 innings. Rather than sign with the Astros, Lindblom chose to attend the University of Tennessee.

After one season with the Tennessee Volunteers, Lindblom transferred to Purdue University for the 2007 season. He was a starter with Tennessee, but became the closer for Purdue in 2007–2008. Lindblom was listed as being among the 75 top college baseball players by USA Baseball. In 2007, he played collegiate summer baseball with the Cotuit Kettleers of the Cape Cod Baseball League and was named a league all-star.

Los Angeles Dodgers
Lindblom was drafted by the Los Angeles Dodgers in the 2nd round of the 2008 MLB draft and made his professional baseball debut that same year with the Single-A Great Lakes Loons in the Midwest League. He started eight games for the Loons, finishing 0–0 with a 1.86 ERA in 29 innings worked. He struck out 33 batters, while walking only 4. He got a late season call-up to the AA Jacksonville Suns, where he made one start.

In 2009, Lindblom pitched in several spring training games for the Major League Dodgers, and there was some speculation that he could even make the big league club to start the season. However, he was instead assigned to start the year with the Dodgers new AA affiliate, the Chattanooga Lookouts. He made 14 appearances for the Lookouts, including 11 starts and had a record of 3–5 and an ERA of 4.71 when he was promoted to the AAA Albuquerque Isotopes. With the Isotopes, Lindblom made three starts and then was transferred to the bullpen. He had a 2.54 ERA in 20 games and was 3–0.

In 2010, Lindblom spent the entire season with Albuquerque. He made 10 starts with the Isotopes, before they decided to return him to being a relief pitcher. He finished the season 3–2 with a 6.54 ERA in 40 appearances. He was demoted to Chattanooga in 2011, where he started the season with seven saves and a 2.96 ERA in 19 games.

On May 29, 2011, Lindblom was called up to the Dodgers. He made his Major League debut in relief on June 1, 2011, against the Colorado Rockies, allowing two hits in a scoreless seventh inning during a 3–0 Dodgers loss. On August 12, 2011, he won his first game, pitching a scoreless tenth inning against the Houston Astros in a game the Dodgers won 1–0 in the bottom of that inning. He pitched in 29.2 innings for the Dodgers in 2011, with a 2.73 ERA and 28 strikeouts.

Philadelphia Phillies
On July 31, 2012, Lindblom was traded to the Philadelphia Phillies along with prospect Ethan Martin for outfielder Shane Victorino. He appeared in 26 games for the Phillies, with a 1-3 record and 4.63 ERA.

Texas Rangers
The Texas Rangers acquired Lindblom and minor league pitching prospect Lisalverto Bonilla on December 9, 2012, from the Philadelphia Phillies in exchange for Michael Young. Lindblom was called up on May 20 when Derek Lowe was designated for assignment and optioned back to the Triple-A Round Rock Express on May 21. He was recalled again on June 9.

Oakland Athletics
On December 3, 2013, Lindblom, along with outfielder Craig Gentry, was traded to the Oakland Athletics for outfielder Michael Choice and infielder Chris Bostick. He was designated for assignment on November 28, 2014.

Pittsburgh Pirates
The Pittsburgh Pirates claimed Lindblom off waivers on December 8, 2014.

Lotte Giants
On December 15, 2014, he signed with the Lotte Giants of the KBO League. He pitched there the next two seasons.

Second Stint With Pirates
On December 16, 2016, Lindblom signed a minor league contract with the Pittsburgh Pirates that included an invitation to spring training. On May 6, 2017, Lindblom was selected to the 40-man and active rosters after Jameson Taillon went down with an injury. He was outrighted to AAA on June 24, 2017. Lindblom was released by the Pirates on July 12, 2017.

Return to KBO
On July 13, 2017, the Lotte Giants announced that they had signed Lindblom again.

Doosan Bears
On December 11, 2017, the Doosan Bears announced the signing of Lindblom to a one-year, $1.45 million contract. 2018 was a successful season for Lindblom; he started 26 games with a 15–4 record, a league-leading 2.88 ERA, and the Pitcher's Golden Glove award. Lindblom received the 2019 KBO League Most Valuable Player Award, after posting a 20–3 record with a 2.50 ERA and 189 strikeouts over  innings. Lindblom received his second pitcher's Golden Glove award for the 2019 season.

Milwaukee Brewers
On December 16, 2019, Lindblom signed a three-year contract worth $9.125 million with the Milwaukee Brewers. In his return to the major leagues in 2020, Lindblom recorded a 2-4 record and a 5.16 ERA with 52 strikeouts in 45.1 innings pitched. After struggling to a 9.72 ERA in 8 appearances, Lindblom was designated for assignment on May 26, 2021. He was outrighted to the Triple-A Nashville Sounds on May 28.  Lindblom played the entire 2022 season with Nashville and became a free agent after the season.

On January 12, 2023, Lindblom announced his retirement from professional baseball via his personal Twitter account.

Pitching style
As a reliever, Lindblom relies chiefly on four-seam and two-seam fastballs around 91 mph and a high-80s cutter, although he also mixed in a curveball, a slider, and a changeup. He was moved to rotation and added an effective splitter to repertoire in his KBO career.

Personal life
Lindblom is married to Aurielle Lindblom. They have three children: Presley, Palmer, and Monroe. Lindblom's daughter, Monroe, was born with a congenital heart defect that has required surgery.

Lindblom is a devoted Christian and attended Dream Center while playing in Los Angeles. Lindblom and his wife also established a charity which donated $20,000 to an Indiana food bank.

References

External links

1987 births
Living people
American people of Swedish descent
American expatriate baseball players in South Korea
Sportspeople from Lafayette, Indiana
People from Lafayette, Indiana
People from Tippecanoe County, Indiana
Baseball players from Indiana
Major League Baseball pitchers
KBO League pitchers
Los Angeles Dodgers players
Philadelphia Phillies players
Texas Rangers players
Oakland Athletics players
Lotte Giants players
Pittsburgh Pirates players
Doosan Bears players
Milwaukee Brewers players
Tennessee Volunteers baseball players
Purdue Boilermakers baseball players
Cotuit Kettleers players
Great Lakes Loons players
Jacksonville Suns players
Chattanooga Lookouts players
Albuquerque Isotopes players
Round Rock Express players
Sacramento River Cats players
Indianapolis Indians players
KBO League Most Valuable Player Award winners
Nashville Sounds players